Abū Yazīd Ṭayfūr bin ʿĪsā bin Surūshān al-Bisṭāmī (al-Basṭāmī) (d. 261/874–5 or 234/848–9), commonly known in the Iranian world as Bāyazīd Bisṭāmī, was a Persian Sufi from north-central Iran. Known to future Sufis as Sultān-ul-Ārifīn ("King of the Gnostics"), Bisṭāmī is considered to be one of the expositors of the state of fanā, the notion of dying in mystical union with Allah. Bastami was famous for "the boldness of his expression of the mystic’s complete absorption into the mysticism." Many "ecstatic utterances" ( shatˤħāt) have been attributed to Bisṭāmī, which lead to him being known as the "drunken" or "ecstatic" (sukr) school of Islamic mysticism. Such utterance may be argued as, Bisṭāmī died with mystical union and the deity is speaking through his tongue. Bisṭāmī also claimed to have ascended through the seven heavens in his dream. His journey, known as the Mi'raj of Bisṭāmī, is clearly patterned on the Mi'raj of the Islamic prophet Muhammad. Bisṭāmī is characterized in three different ways: a free thinking radical, a pious Sufi who is deeply concerned with following the sha'ria and engaging in "devotions beyond the obligatory," and a pious individual who is presented as having a dream similar to the Mi'raj of Muhammed. The Mi'raj of Bisṭāmī seems as if Bisṭāmī is going through a self journey; as he ascends through each heaven, Bisṭāmī is gaining knowledge in how he communicates with the angels (e.g. languages and gestures) and the number of angels he encounters increases.

His grandfather Surūshān was born a Zoroastrian, an indication that Bastami had Persian heritage, despite the fact that his transmitted sayings are in Arabic. Very little is known about the life of Bastami, whose importance lies in his biographical tradition, since he left no written works. The early biographical reports portray him as a wanderer but also as the leader of teaching circles. The early biographers describe him as a mystic who dismissed excessive asceticism; but who was also scrupulous about ritual purity, to the point of washing his tongue before chanting God's names.  He also appreciated the work of the great jurists. A measure that shows how influential his image remains in posterity is the fact that he is named in the lineage (silsila) of one of the largest Sufi brotherhoods today, the Naqshbandi order.

Background 
The name Bastami means "from Bastam".  Bayazid's grandfather, Sorūshān, was a Zoroastrian who converted to Islam. His grandfather had three sons, who were named: Adam, İsa and Ali. All of them were ascetics. Bayazid was the son of İsa. Not much is known of Bayazid's childhood, but he spent most of his time isolated in his house, and the mosque. Although he remained in isolation from the material world, he did not isolate himself from the Sufi realm. He welcomed people into his house to discuss Islam. Like his father and uncles, Bayazid led a life of asceticism and renounced all worldly pleasures in order to be one with Allah The Exalted. Ultimately, this led Bayazid to a state of "self union" which, according to many Sufi orders, is the only state a person could be in order to attain unity with God.

Influence 
Bastami's predecessor Dhul-Nun al-Misri (d. CE 859) was a murid "initiate" as well. Al-Misri had formulated the doctrine of ma'rifa (gnosis), presenting a system which helped the murid and the sheikh (guide) to communicate. Bayazid Bastami took this a step further and emphasized the importance of religious ecstasy in Islam, referred to in his words as drunkenness (Sukr or wajd), a means of self-annihilation in the Divine Presence of the Creator. Before him, the Sufi path was mainly based on piety and obedience and he played a major role in placing the concept of divine love at the core of Sufism.

When Bayazid died, he was over seventy years old. Before he died, someone asked him his age. He said: "I am four years old. For seventy years, I was veiled. I got rid of my veils only four years ago."

Bayazid died in 874 CE and is likely buried in Bistam. There is also a shrine in Kirikhan, Turkey in the name of Bayazid Bastami. His corpus of writings is minimal when compared to his influence. His ascetic approach to religious studies emphasizes his sole devotion to the almighty.

Shrine in Chittagong, Bangladesh 

There is a Sufi shrine in Chittagong, Bangladesh, dating back to 850 AD, that is said to be Bastami's tomb. Although this may be unlikely, given the fact that Bastami was never known to have visited Bangladesh. However, Sufism spread throughout the Middle East, parts of Asia and Northern Africa, and many Sufi teachers where influenced in the spread of Islam in Bengal. Also, one local legend says that Bastami did visit Chattagong, which might explain the belief of the locals in Chittagong. Nevertheless, Islamic scholars usually attribute the tomb to Bayazid. While there is no recorded evidence of his visit to the region, Chittagong was a major port on the southern silk route connecting India, China and the Middle East, and the first Muslims to travel to China may have used the Chittagong-Burma-Sichuan trade route. Chittagong was a religious city and also a center of Sufism and Muslim merchants in the subcontinent since the 9th century, and it is possible that either Bayazid or his followers visited the port city around the middle of the 9th century.

Gallery

Notes

References
  Arthur John Arberry, Bistamiana, BSOAS 25/1 (1962) 28–37
 ʿAbd al-Raḥmān al-Badawī, Shaṭaḥāt al-Ṣūfiyya, Cairo 1949
 Carl W. Ernst, Words of ecstasy in Sufism, Albany 1985
 Carl W. Ernst, The man without attributes. Ibn ʿArabī's interpretation of al-Bisṭāmī, Journal of the Muhyiddin Ibn ʿArabi Society, 13 (1993), 1–18
 ʿAbd al-Rafīʿ Ḥaqīqat, Sulṭān al-ʿĀrifīn Bāyazīd Basṭāmī, Tehran 1361sh/1982
 Max Horten, Indische Strömungen in der islamischen Mystik, 2 vols., Heidelberg 1927–8
 ʿAlī al-Hujwīrī, Kashf al-maḥjūb, ed. V. A. Zhukovskiĭ, Leningrad 1926 repr. Tehran 1957
 Abū Nuʿaym ʿAlī b. Sahl Iṣfahānī, Ḥilyat al-awliyāʾ, 10 vols., Cairo 1932–8
 ʿAbd al-Raḥmān Jāmī, Nafaḥāt al-uns, ed. Maḥmūd ʿĀbidī, Tehran 1370sh/1991
 Mahmud Khatami, Zaehner-Arberry controversy on Abu Yazid the Sufi. A historical review, Transcendent Philosophy 7 (2006), 203–26
 Abdelwahab Meddeb (trans.), Les dits de Bistami, Paris 1989
 Jawid Ahmad Mojaddedi, The biographical tradition in Sufism. The Ṭabaqāt genre from al-Sulamī to Jāmī, Richmond, Surrey 2001
 Jawid Ahmad Mojaddedi, Getting drunk with Abū Yazīd or staying sober with Junayd. The creation of a popular typology of Sufism, BSOAS 66/1 (2003), 1–13
 Reynold A. Nicholson, An early Arabic version of the Miʿrāj of Abū Yazīd al-Bisṭāmī, Islamica 2 (1926), 402–15
 Javād Nūrbakhsh, Bāyazīd, Tehran 1373sh/1994
 Hellmut Ritter, Die Aussprüche des Bāyezīd Bisṭāmī, in Fritz Meier (ed.), Westöstliche Abhandlungen (Wiesbaden 1954), 231–43
 Jalāl al-Dīn Rūmī, Fīhi mā fīhi, ed. Badīʿ al-Zamān Furūzānfar, Tehran 1957
 Jalāl al-Dīn Rūmī, Mathnawī, ed. Reynold A. Nicholson, 8 vols., London 1925–40
 Rūzbihān Baqlī, Sharḥ-i shaṭḥiyyāt, ed. Henri Corbin, Tehran 1966
 al-Sarrāj, Kitāb al-lumaʿ fī l-taṣawwuf, ed. Reynold Alleyne Nicholson, Leiden and London 1914
 August Tholuck, Ssufismus sive Theosophia Persarum pantheistica, Berlin 1821
 Robert C. Zaehner, Abū Yazīd of Bisṭām. A turning point in Islamic mysticism, Indo-Iranian Journal 1 (1957), 286–301
 Robert C. Zaehner, Hindu and Muslim mysticism, London 1960.

Further reading

External links

 Bayazid's Tomb in Iran
 The Naqshbandiya Khalidiya Haqqaniya Tariqa in Italy
 The Naqshbandi-Mujaddidiya Chain in the USA and Europe

804 births
874 deaths
9th-century Iranian people
Naqshbandi order
Iranian Sufis
People from Semnan Province
Iranian Muslim mystics